The 2013–14 season is Happy Valley's 48th season in the Hong Kong First Division League, as well as their debut season after their promotion to the top-tier division in 2012–13 season. Happy Valley will compete in the First Division League, Senior Challenge Shield and FA Cup in this season.

Key events
 5 June 2013: Hong Kong midfielder Yeung Chi Lun joins the club from First Division club Sunray Cave JC Sun Hei for free.
 8 June 2013: Cameroon-born Hong Kong striker Julius Akosah joins the club from fellow First Division club Biu Chun Rangers for an undisclosed fee.
 8 June 2013: Cameroon-born Hong Kong midfielder Wilfred Bamnjo joins the club from fellow First Division club Biu Chun Rangers for an undisclosed fee.
 8 June 2013: Hong Kong goalkeeper Pang Tsz Kin joins the club from newly relegated Second Division club Wofoo Tai Po for free.
 8 June 2013: Hong Kong midfielder Cheng Chi Wing joins the club from fellow First Division club Royal Southern for an undisclosed fee.
 8 June 2013: Hong Kong midfielder Wong Yim Kwan joins the club from newly relegated Second Division club Wofoo Tai Po for free.
 8 June 2013: Hong Kong striker Yan Pak Long joins the club from Second Division club Wing Yee for free.
 8 June 2013: Hong Kong defender To Philip Michael joins the club from fellow First Division club Royal Southern for an undisclosed fee.
 8 June 2013: Hong Kong defender Chu Ka Chun joins the club from fellow First Division club Yokohama FC Hong Kong for an undisclosed fee.
 19 June 2013: The club reveals their squad for the new season with 15 players will stay at the club.
 25 June 2013: The club fails to meet an agreement with Lau Ka Shing and therefore he is free to leave the club.
 28 June 2013: Hong Kong midfielder Choi Kwok Wai joins the club from fellow First Division club Sunray Cave JC Sun Hei for an undisclosed fee.
 5 July 2013: Paraguayan defender Pablo Leguizamón Arce joins the club on loan from Primera B Nacional club Colegiales until the end of season.
 5 July 2013: Argentinian midfielder Jonathan Leonel Acosta joins the club on loan from Argentine Torneo Argentino B club 9 de Julio de Morteros until the end of season.
 5 July 2013: Argentinian striker Diego Daniel Cañete joins the club on loan from Argentine Primera División club Club Atlético Belgrano until the end of season.
 9 July 2013: Argentinian goalkeeper Mauro Andrés Beltramella joins the club from Argentine Torneo Argentino A club Unión de Mar del Plata for an undisclosed fee.
 31 July 2013: Montenegrin goalkeeper Darko Božović joins the club on loan from Serbian First League club FK Bežanija until the end of the season.
 31 July 2013: Argentinian striker Leonardo Abálsamo joins the club on loan from Argentinian club Sportivo Peñarol until the end of the season.
 31 July 2013: Croatian defender Saša Mus joins the club on loan from Bosnian Premier League club NK Zvijezda Gradačac until the end of the season.
 8 October 2013: Head coach Sergio Timoner resigns and is promoted as the Technical Director of the club. The club appoints Paul Foster as the new head coach.
 1 January 2014: Hong Kong goalkeeper Leung Man Fai leaves the club and joins fellow First Division club Eastern Salon for an undisclosed fee.
 6 January 2014: After losing to Sunray Cave JC Sun Hei by 0–5 at Tsing Yi Sports Ground, the ICAC takes away 19 players and staff including Darko Božović and Saša Mus on allegations of match fixing.
 12 February 2014: The Hong Kong FA announced that Happy Valley and fellow first division club Tuen Mun will be suspended for the rest of the season pending an ICAC investigation on allegations of match fixing and bad financial circumstances.
 8 March 2014: Hong Kong midfielder Choi Kwok Wai leaves the club and joins fellow First Division club Sun Pegasus on a free transfer.

Players

Squad information

Last update: 1 January 2014
Source: Happy Valley
Ordered by squad number.
LPLocal player; FPForeign player; NRNon-registered player

Transfers

In

Out

Loan In

Loan out

Club

Coaching staff

Squad statistics

Overall Stats
{|class="wikitable" style="text-align: center;"
|-
!width="100"|
!width="60"|First Division
!width="60"|Senior Shield
!width="60"|FA Cup
!width="60"|Total Stats
|-
|align=left|Games played    ||  1  ||  0  || 0  || 1
|-
|align=left|Games won       ||  0  ||  0  || 0  || 0
|-
|align=left|Games drawn     ||  0  ||  0  || 0  || 0
|-
|align=left|Games lost      ||  1  ||  0  || 0  || 1
|-
|align=left|Goals for       ||  0  ||  0  || 0  || 0
|-
|align=left|Goals against   ||  3  ||  0  || 0  || 3
|- =
|align=left|Players used    ||  14 ||  0  || 0  || 141
|-
|align=left|Yellow cards    ||  5  ||  0  || 0  || 5
|-
|align=left|Red cards       ||  0  ||  0  || 0  || 0
|-

Players Used: Happy Valley have used a total of 14 different players in all competitions.

Squad Stats

Top scorers

Disciplinary record
Includes all competitive matches. Players listed below made at least one appearance for Southern first squad during the season.

Starting 11
This will show the most used players in each position, based on Happy Valley's typical starting formation once the season commences.

Substitution Record
Includes all competitive matches.

Last updated: 13 October 2013

Captains

Competitions

Overall

First Division League

Classification

Results summary

Results by round

Matches

Pre-season friendlies

First Division League

Senior Shield

Notes

References

Happy Valley AA seasons
Hap